Mimandria recognita is a moth of the family Geometridae first described by Max Saalmüller in 1891. It is found on Madagascar.

References

Moths described in 1891
Pseudoterpnini